The Tokyo Blues is an album by jazz pianist Horace Silver released on the Blue Note label in 1962, featuring performances by Silver with Blue Mitchell, Junior Cook, Gene Taylor, and Joe Harris (filling in for Roy Brooks). The AllMusic review awarded the album 4 stars.

Track listing
All compositions by Horace Silver except as indicated

 "Too Much Sake" – 6:45
 "Sayonara Blues" – 12:12
 "The Tokyo Blues" – 7:39
 "Cherry Blossom" (Ronnell Bright) – 6:11
 "Ah! So" – 7:05

Recorded on July 13 (tracks 2–3) & July 14 (tracks 1 & 4–5), 1962.

Personnel
Horace Silver – piano
Blue Mitchell – trumpet (tracks 1–3 & 5)
Junior Cook – tenor saxophone (tracks 1–3 & 5)
Gene Taylor – bass
Joe Harris (credited as "John Harris, Jr.") – drums

Production
 Alfred Lion – production
 Reid Miles – design
 Rudy Van Gelder – engineering
 Francis Wolff – photography

References

Horace Silver albums
1962 albums
Blue Note Records albums
Albums produced by Alfred Lion
Albums recorded at Van Gelder Studio